Raškovice is a municipality and village in Frýdek-Místek District in the Moravian-Silesian Region of the Czech Republic. It has about 2,000 inhabitants.

Geography
Raškovice lies in the historical region of Cieszyn Silesia. The municipality is located in the Moravian-Silesian Foothills on the left bank of the Morávka River.

History
The first written mention of Raškovice is from 1305 as Holzmul settlement and Rudgeri villa. The village under its current name was first mentioned in 1573.

After World War I and fall of Austria-Hungary it became a part of Czechoslovakia. In March 1939 it became a part of Protectorate of Bohemia and Moravia. After World War II it was restored to Czechoslovakia.

References

External links

 

Villages in Frýdek-Místek District
Cieszyn Silesia